James David Macdonald (March 15, 1922 – August 20, 1995) was a Canadian politician and lawyer from Alberta. He served as an Alderman on Calgary City Council from October 24, 1955 to October 22, 1959.

Political career
Macdonald ran as a candidate in the 1959 Alberta general election. He ran for the Progressive Conservatives in the electoral district of Calgary North. Macdonald was in a tough race version three MLAs. He finished second in the race taking 26% of the popular vote.

Personal life and death
Macdonald moved himself and his family to Grand Cayman becoming the first qualified lawyer to live on the island. He wrote the Companies Law to make Grand Cayman a tax haven. He died on August 20, 1995, at the age of 73.

References

1922 births
1995 deaths
Calgary city councillors
Progressive Conservative Association of Alberta candidates in Alberta provincial elections